Ruttenberg may refer to:

 Danya Ruttenberg (born 1975), American rabbi, editor, author
 Derald Ruttenberg (1916-2004), American lawyer who organized industrial mergers
 Harold J. Ruttenberg (1914-1998), American steel union activist, then steel executive
 Joseph Ruttenberg (1889-1983), Russian-born American photojournalist,  cinematographer
 Nelson Ruttenberg (1893-1959), American lawyer, politician
 Stanley H. Ruttenberg (1917-2001), American labor activist, Federal government official